Huijuan is a transliteration of multiple Chinese given names, including 惠娟 and 慧娟. Notable people with these names include:

 Su Huijuan (born 1964), Chinese volleyball player
 Zhong Huijuan (born 1961), Chinese pharmaceutical executive and billionaire

Chinese given names